Samantha Hamilton (born 8 April 1973 in Victoria) was a first basewoman and outfielder for the Australia women's national baseball team. 

Hamilton was a member of the Australian team which memorably claimed silver at the 2010 IBAF Women's World Cup in Venezuela - Australia's first ever Women's World Cup medal and best ever World Cup result. 

Prior to the  IBAF sanctioning the World Cups in 2004, Hamilton also won  gold in the 2002 & 2003 World Series with Australia, plus a bronze in 2001.

In the 2006 Women's Baseball World Cup Hamilton stole the most bases for the tournament (6 from 6 games).

At the time of her retirement, she was the only female baseball player in Australia to have played at every Australian Championships and in every Australian Women's team since their inceptions.

Hamilton is a 10-time national champion with Victoria, claiming titles in 2000, 01, 02, 04, 05, 07, 08, 09, 11, 13. Hamilton was named 'Hitting Champion' at the 2012 Nationals in Canberra and named to the All Star team and Team Victoria MVP in the same year. .

As a player in the Victorian Women's League, she plays with the Doncaster Dragons, helping them to three premierships and winning numerous league batting titles. 

Hamilton is also the Head Women's Program Coach (since 2006) of the Doncaster Dragons Baseball Club in Melbourne, Australia.

External links
Samantha Hamilton – Australian Baseball Federation profile

1973 births
Australian female baseball players
Living people
Sportswomen from Victoria (Australia)
Sportspeople from Melbourne